Meissner’s Latin Phrase-book is a book of phrases in Latin for students of composition or those wanting to learn spoken Latin.

History of the English text
The English text is a translation of Carl Meissner’s (1830–1900) sixth German edition. (Meissner was also the author of a study of Terence and should not be confused with the Swiss botanist of the same name). It was first translated into English by H. W. Auden, who added more phrases. The book then went through multiple reprints and editions during the twentieth century and is still being used and cited as a source.

Most recent editions
Latin Phrasebook, C. Meissner and H. W. Auden, Hippocrene (1998)  
Latin Phrase Book, C. Meissner, Duckworth (1981)

References

External links
Latin Phrase-Book at Project Gutenberg.
Table of Contents on Amazon
 Meißner, Carl (1830-1900) Biographisches Stichwort accessed 27 April 2010 
 Plain text, PDF and searchable HTML editions; Anki flashcards.

Latin language